Georgetown is a town located on the island of Saint Vincent. It is the only town in Charlotte Parish with a populace numbering about 1,700. Georgetown was one of the main site for sugar production in the island. It was also the capital city of the country.

References

See also
 Saint Vincent and the Grenadines

Populated places in Saint Vincent and the Grenadines